Brooks Astronomical Observatory  is an astronomical observatory owned and operated by Central Michigan University.  It is located in Mount Pleasant,  Michigan (USA). The observatory was established in 1964 and is located on the roof of the Brooks Hall science building.  Both the building and observatory are named for Kendall P. Brooks, instructor of astronomy and other subjects in the period of 1910-1947.

The original 20-inch (50-cm) reflector functioned poorly and was replaced in 1977 by a 14-inch (35-cm) Schmidt-Cassegrain.  This was in turn replaced in 1996 with a 16-inch (40-cm) computer-controlled Cassegrain reflector manufactured by DFM Engineering. The DFM telescope is equipped for CCD direct imaging, medium-dispersion spectroscopy and visual observing. Professional work at the observatory has included photoelectric and visual timings of lunar and asteroidal occultations; photometric measures of variable stars, cluster stars, and spectroscopic binaries; and astrometry of minor planets and comets. Monthly public open nights were established in 1976.

See also 
List of astronomical observatories

References

External links
 Brooks Astronomical Observatory Clear Sky Clock Forecasts of observing conditions.

Astronomical observatories in Michigan
Central Michigan University
1964 establishments in Michigan
Buildings and structures in Isabella County, Michigan
Tourist attractions in Isabella County, Michigan